Hélias de Saint-Yrieix (died 1367) was a French Benedictine abbot, bishop and Cardinal.

He was born at Saint-Yrieix-la-Perche and became abbot of the Abbey of Saint-Florent de Saumur, Saumur, in 1335. In 1344, he became bishop of Uzès.

He was created cardinal priest of Stefano al Monte Celio in 1356. In 1363, he was bishop of Ostia.  Upon his death, 10 May 1367, he was buried in the Franciscan Church in Avignon.

References

1367 deaths
French Benedictines
14th-century French cardinals
Cardinal-bishops of Ostia
Bishops of Uzès
French abbots
Year of birth unknown